In geometry, a diminished trapezohedron is a polyhedron in an infinite set of polyhedra, constructed by removing one of the polar vertices of a trapezohedron and replacing it by a new face (diminishment). It has one regular  base face,  triangle faces around the base, and  kites meeting on top. The kites can also be replaced by rhombi with specific proportions.

Along with the set of pyramids and elongated pyramids, these figures are topologically self-dual.

It can also be seen as an augmented  antiprism, with a  pyramid augmented onto one of the  faces, and whose height is adjusted so the upper antiprism triangle faces can be made coparallel to the pyramid faces and merged into kite-shaped faces.

This sequence has sets of two triangles instead of kite faces.

Examples

Special cases 

There are three special case geometries of the diminished trigonal trapezohedron. The simplest is a diminished cube. The Chestahedron, named after artist Frank Chester, is constructed with equilateral triangles around the base, and the geometry adjusted so the kite faces have the same area as the equilateral triangles. The last can be seen by augmenting a regular tetrahedron and an octahedron, leaving 10 equilateral triangle faces, and then merging 3 sets of coparallel equilateral triangular faces into 3 (60 degree) rhombic faces. It can also be seen as a tetrahedron with 3 of 4 of its vertices rectified.  The three rhombic faces fold out flat to form half of a hexagram.

See also
 Elongated pyramid
 Gyroelongated bipyramid
 Elongated bipyramid
 Gyroelongated pyramid
 Tetrahedrally diminished dodecahedron

References

Symmetries of Canonical Self-Dual Polyhedra 7F,C3v: 9,C4v: 11,C5v:, 13,C6v:, 15,C7v:.

Polyhedra